Guyana participated at the 2010 Summer Youth Olympics in Singapore.

The Guyana team consisted of 4 athletes competing in 3 sports: athletics, swimming and table tennis.

Athletics

Boys
Track and Road Events

Girls
Track and Road Events

Swimming

Table tennis

Individual

Team

References

External links
Competitors List: Guyana

Nations at the 2010 Summer Youth Olympics
2010 in Guyanese sport
Guyana at the Youth Olympics